The Seafarer 45 is a Dutch sailboat that was designed by Americans Sparkman & Stephens as a racer-cruiser and first built in 1961. The sloop version was S&S design #1618 and the yawl version design #1618.1.

The boat was later sold under the name Sailmaster 45.

Production
The design was built by Werf Gusto in the Netherlands, starting in 1961 and imported into the United States by Seafarer Yachts, but it is now out of production.

Design
The Seafarer 45 is a recreational keelboat, built predominantly of fiberglass, with mahogany and teak wood trim. It has a masthead sloop rig or optional yawl rig, with the addition of a mizzen mast. The hull has a raked stem; a raised counter, angled transom; a keel-mounted rudder controlled by a wheel and a fixed modified long keel, with a cutaway forefoot. The sloop version displaces  and carries  of lead ballast, while the yawl model displaces  and carries  of ballast.

The boat is fitted with a Gray Marine 491 gasoline engine for docking and maneuvering.

The design has sleeping accommodation for eight people, with a double "V"-berth in the bow cabin, two straight settee berths and two pilot berths in the main cabin and an aft cabin with a double berth. The galley is located on the port side at the companionway ladder. The galley is "U"-shaped and is equipped with a three-burner stove, an ice box and a sink. A navigation station is opposite the galley, on the starboard side. There are two heads, one just aft of the bow cabin on the port side and one on the starboard side at the companionway.

See also
List of sailing boat types

References

External links
Photo of a Seafarer 45 Yawl sailing

Keelboats
1960s sailboat type designs
Sailing yachts 
Sailboat type designs by Sparkman and Stephens
Sailboat types built by Werf Gusto